The 2021–22 Vijay Hazare Trophy was the twentieth season of the Vijay Hazare Trophy, a List A cricket tournament that was played in India. It was contested by 38 teams, divided into six groups, with eight teams in Plate Group. The tournament was announced by the BCCI on 3 July 2021. Tripura won the Plate Group to advance to the preliminary quarter-finals.

Points table

Fixtures
Source:

Round 1

Round 2

Round 3

Round 4

Round 5

References

Vijay Hazare Trophy
Vijay Hazare Trophy